Heteropogon is a genus of robber flies in the family Asilidae. There are at least 60 described species in Heteropogon.

Species

References

Further reading

External links

 
 

Asilidae genera